Kendal Briles (born November 10, 1982) is an American football coach. He is currently the offensive coordinator for Texas Christian University.

Playing career
Briles played college football at the University of Texas at Austin and University of Houston as a quarterback, wide receiver and safety.

Coaching career

Baylor
In 2008, Briles joined his father at Baylor University as inside receivers coach and offensive recruiting coordinator. From 2012 to 2014 he served as Baylor's passing game coordinator, receivers coach and offensive recruiting coordinator. In 2015 Briles was promoted to offensive coordinator. He was a 2015 finalist for the Broyles Award, given annually to the nation's top college football assistant coach. 

In 2016, Baylor's football team came under fire when it was revealed university officials had failed to take action regarding alleged rapes and other assaults by Baylor football players. The scandal led to the ouster of head football coach Art Briles (Kendal's father), the demotion and eventual resignation of Baylor University President Ken Starr, the resignation of Athletic Director Ian McCaw, and the firing of two others connected with the football program.

FAU
In December 2016, FAU announced that Kendal Briles would be their new offensive coordinator. Head coach Lane Kiffin said Briles will be given "full control" over the offense, including play-calling duties.

Houston

In January 2018, Briles became the new assistant head coach, offensive coordinator, and quarterbacks coach at his alma mater, the University of Houston. He resigned from this position on December 22, 2018.

Florida State

In December 2018, Briles became the new offensive coordinator and quarterbacks coach under Willie Taggart at Florida State University who was then fired with three games left in his second season. On December 11, 2019, new head coach Mike Norvell announced Kenny Dillingham as the Seminoles' new offensive coordinator, succeeding Briles.

Arkansas
On December 23, 2019, Briles was named the offensive coordinator at the University of Arkansas under new head coach Sam Pittman.  In March 2022, Briles was given a raise and a contract extension through the 2024 season, after Arkansas finished the 2021 season 9-4 and won the 2022 Outback Bowl. Briles then turned down an offer to be the OC at Mississippi State, and was given another raise by Arkansas in early January 2023 after the 2022 Razorbacks finished the season 7-6 and won the 2022 Liberty Bowl. After TCU made a bid for Briles' services in mid-January, Arkansas refused to match the offer, deciding to not give Briles yet another raise. Briles was replaced at Arkansas by Maryland OC Dan Enos on the same day Briles was announced as the new coordinator at TCU.

TCU

Briles was hired by TCU as their offensive coordinator on January 19, 2023, replacing Garrett Riley.

Personal life
Briles' father, Art, was his head coach at the University of Houston and Baylor University.

References

External links
Baylor Bears bio
Houston Cougars bio

1982 births
Living people
Sportspeople from Abilene, Texas
Players of American football from Texas
American football quarterbacks
American football wide receivers
American football safeties
Texas Longhorns football players
Houston Cougars football players
Baylor Bears football coaches
Florida Atlantic Owls football coaches
Houston Cougars football coaches
Florida State Seminoles football coaches
Arkansas Razorbacks football coaches
TCU Horned Frogs football coaches